The men's 300 m time trial competition in inline speed skating at the 2009 World Games took place on 17 July 2009 at the Yangming Skating Rink in Kaohsiung, Taiwan.

Competition format
A total of 17 athletes entered the competition. Best twelve athletes from preliminary round advances to the final.

Results

Preliminary

Final

References

External links
 Results on IWGA website

Inline speed skating at the 2009 World Games